Pococke is a surname, and may refer to

Edward Pococke (1604–1691), an English Orientalist and biblical scholar.
Richard Pococke (1704–1765), an English prelate and anthropologist.

See also
Pocock
Pococke Kition inscriptions